James Brunton is a Canadian judge.

James Brunton may also refer to:                                                                                                       
Sir James Lauder Brunton, 4th Baronet (born 1947), of the Brunton baronets
Sir (James) Stopford Lauder Brunton, 2nd Baronet (1884–1943), of the Brunton baronets

See also

Brunton (disambiguation)